List of ships built by Aberdeen shipbuilders Hall, Russell & Company, from yard number 501 to 600.

The ships built in the sequence 501 to 600 cover the period 1911 — 1917. The vessels built during this period are typically armed trawlers and smaller naval vessels for the Admiralty.

Notes
 Where available, vessel measurements taken from Lloyd's Register, giving registered length, beam and draft. Hall, Russell and Company's own measurements typically are length overall, beam and moulded depth.
 Yard Number 554, 558 allocated twice in records

References

Ships built in Scotland